Latastia  cherchii is a species of lizard in the family Lacertidae. The species is endemic to  Somalia.

Etymology
The specific name, cherchii, is in honor of Italian herpetologist Maria Adelaide Cherchi.

Geographic range
L. cherchii is found in central Somalia.

Habitat
The preferred natural habitat of L. cherchii is desert.

Reproduction
L. cherchii is oviparous.

References

Further reading
Arillo A, Balletto E, Spanò S (1967). "Il genere Latastia Bedriaga in Somalia". Bollettino dei Musei e degli Istituti Biologici dell'Università di Genova 35: 105–145. (Latastia cherchii, new species, p. 132). (in Italian).
Lanza B (1983). "A List of the Somali Amphibians and Reptiles". Monitore Zoologico Italiano. Supplemento 18 (1): 193–247. (Latastia cherchii, p. 215). (in English, with an abstract in Italian).
Lanza B (1990). "Amphibians and reptiles of the Somali Democratic Republic: check list and biogeography". Biogeographia 14: 407–465. (Latastia cherchii, p. 427).

Reptiles described in 1967
Latastia
Endemic fauna of Somalia
Reptiles of Somalia
Taxa named by Emilio Balletto
Taxa named by Silvio Spanò
Hobyo grasslands and shrublands